Roger Ben Boris Aholou (born 30 December 1993) is a professional footballer who plays as a defensive midfielder for Botola club Raja CA. Born in the Ivory Coast and of Togolese descent, he played for the Ivory Coast national team once, before switching to play for the Togo national team.

Career
Aholou began his senior career with the Ivorian clubs Stella Club and FC San Pedro, before moving to the Tunisian club Monastir on 16 November 2020. He made his professional debut with Monastir in a 2–1 Tunisian Ligue Professionnelle 1 loss to CS Sfaxien on 10 December 2020.

International career
Aholou was born in the Ivory Coast, and is of Togolese descent through his father. He made his debut with the Ivory Coast national team in a 2–0 2020 African Nations Championship qualification loss to Niger on 22 September 2019. He switched to represent the Togo national team for matches in September 2021. He debuted with the Togo national team in a 2–0 2022 FIFA World Cup qualification loss to Senegal national team on 1 September 2021.

Personal life
Aholou's father was a Togolese footballer who played, and then settled in the Ivory Coast. He is the brother of the Ivorian international footballer Jean-Eudes Aholou.

References

External links
 
 

1993 births
Living people
Footballers from Abidjan
Citizens of Togo through descent
Togolese footballers
Togo international footballers
Ivorian footballers
Ivory Coast international footballers
Ivorian people of Togolese descent
Stella Club d'Adjamé players
FC San-Pédro players
Raja CA players
US Monastir (football) players
Ligue 1 (Ivory Coast) players
Tunisian Ligue Professionnelle 1 players
Association football midfielders
Togolese expatriate footballers
Togolese expatriate sportspeople in Tunisia
Ivorian expatriate footballers
Ivorian expatriate sportspeople in Tunisia
Expatriate footballers in Tunisia
Dual internationalists (football)